Linos Ngompek is a Ugandan politician and currently member of Parliament for Kibanda North County in Kiryandong District.

He served as RDC before becoming a member of Parliament after defeating Taban Amin the grandson of former Uganda president Idi Amin Dada.

In the eleventh parliament, she serves on the Committee on Gender, Labour and Social Development.

References 

Ugandan politicians
Living people
Kiryandongo District
Year of birth missing (living people)